The Hessen Affair is a 2009 Belgian film noir-style thriller movie, partly filmed in Manitoba, Canada, scripted by Nicholas Meyer and directed by Paul Breuls and starring Billy Zane, Lyne Renee, Noah Segan, and Michael Bowen. The movie was released on DVD as The Hessen Conspiracy.

Plot
Immediately after World War II, two American officers (played by Bill Zane and Lyne Renee) are stationed in Frankfurt, Germany, killing time in the fancy Kronberg Castle. They discover there a cache of priceless jewels, formerly owned by Sophie, Princess Christoph of Hesse and the former German Imperial royal family. But when the two lovers try to smuggle the treasure back in the US and sell it, their plans become quickly complicated by military investigators and violent criminals. Now, if they are able to remain faithful to each other, they may become incredibly rich.

The film is based on the theft of the jewels of Hessen-Kassel family in 1946.

Cast
 Billy Zane as Jack Durant
 Lyne Renée as Lt. Kathleen Nash
 Michael Bowen as Ben Cassidy
 Noah Segan as Lt. David Pallard
 Mireille Leveque as Sophie, Princess Christoph of Hesse
 Rudolph Segers as Sgt. Roy Tarlton

References

External links

2009 films
2009 thriller films
English-language Belgian films
Films with screenplays by Nicholas Meyer
Films scored by Stephen Warbeck
Treasure hunt films
Films set in 1945
2000s English-language films
Belgian thriller films